Klaten Regency is a regency in Central Java province in Indonesia. It covers an area of 655.56 km2 and had a population of 1,130,047 at the 2010 Census and 1,260,506 at the 2020 Census. Its capital is the town of the same name (the town extends over three of the regency's districts, with 133,765 inhabitants in 2020).

Geography and Climate

Geography
Klaten borders on Boyolali Regency in the North, Sukoharjo Regency and Wonogiri Regency in the East, and Special Region of Yogyakarta to the South and West. Candi Prambanan, one of the biggest Hindu structures in Indonesia, is in the regency.

The 2006 Yogyakarta earthquake damaged the area, located near to the active Mount Merapi volcano in central Java.
The 2010 eruptions of Mount Merapi had a great impact on Klaten and its surrounding areas. A few of the victims who were affected by the eruption came from the region of Klaten. The volcanic eruptions were so loud they caused panic and a rush for residents to seek refuge.

Klaten has a humid (> 0.65 p/pet) climate. The landscape is mostly covered with rainfed croplands, residential areas, and isolated stands of trees. The climate is classified as a Tropical Monsoon (short dry season, monsoon rains other months), with a tropical moist forest biozone . The soil in the area is high in nitosols, andosols (nt), soil with deep, clay-enriched lower horizon with shiny ped surfaces.

Climate
Klaten has a tropical monsoon climate (Am) according to Köppen climate classification. Average temperature varies little from month to month. October is warmest with an average temperature of 26.5 °C. July is coldest with an average temperature of 24.8 °C. The wet season has a rainfall peak around January. The dry season centers around the month of August, which has the most sunshine.

Administrative

The regional government of Klaten was established on 28 October 1950. Its 26 districts (kecamatan) are subdivided into 391 rural villages (desa) and 10 urban village (kelurahan ). The area includes  tourist sites, places of interest, traditional arts, traditional events and handicraft centers.

Administrative districts
Klaten Regency is divided into twenty-six districts (kecamatan), tabulated below with their areas and their populations at the 2010 Census and the 2020 Census. The table also includes the number of administrative villages (rural desa and urban keluraham) in each district and its post code.

Place of Interest
Tourist objects in Klaten Regency are:
 Sewu Prambanan Temple, is a traditional cultural tourism, and traditional ceremony that is potential.
 Deles Indah Nature, is located in the' slope of Mount Merapi, exactly in Sidorejo Village of Kemalang District.
 Jombor swamp, is located in Krakitan Village of Bayat District.
 Nilo and Ponggok Water source, is located in a fishing area of Janti, Janti Village, Polanharjo District and Pongkok water source in Dukuh Nganjat Pongkok Village of Polanharjo District.
 Ki Ageng Pandanaran Graveyard in Paseban Village, Bayat District.
In addition there is a ceremonial festival using kue apam in Jatinom each year.

Footnotes

External links
   Official website
   twitter account for information and community in Klaten
   Photos around Klaten
   Forum Komunitas dan Komunikasi Warga Klaten